Calibrachoa elegans is a plant species in the genus Calibrachoa found in Minas Gerais in Brazil.

References

External links

Petunioideae
Plants described in 1997
Flora of Minas Gerais